Faraones de Texcoco is a Mexican football club that plays in the Liga TDP. The club is based in  Texcoco, State of Mexico.

History
The club was founded in August 2017 with the goal of having a team that represents Texcoco. Previously, there had been clubs based in this town like Deportivo Neza, Atlético Veracruz or Emperadores de Texcoco, but had been re-established in that place or were operated and integrated by people from other cities. 

In the 2018-19 season the team finished the regular season with 68 points and reached the round of 16 in the championship phase. In the 2020-21 season the team achieved the lead in group VII with 82 points and thus was able to access the play-off phase for promotion. In the first rounds he eliminated the Sangre de Campeón and Deportiva Venados clubs, to finally be eliminated in the quarterfinals of the zone by Fuertes de Fortín F.C., thus closing the best participation so far.

Current squad

See also
Futbol in Mexico
Texcoco
Tercera División de México

References

External links
Facebook fanpage

Texcoco, State of Mexico
Football clubs in the State of Mexico
Association football clubs established in 2017
2017 establishments in Mexico